Roger Queugnet (28 May 1923 - 17 November 2020) was a French racing cyclist. He rode in the 1950 Tour de France.

References

1923 births
2020 deaths
French male cyclists
Place of birth missing